Crialese is an Italian surname. Notable people with the surname include:

Carlo Crialese (born 1992), Italian footballer
Emanuele Crialese (born 1965), Italian screenwriter and film director

Italian-language surnames